Arthur Gerald "Gerry" Fairhead (March 23, 1923 – July 5, 2019) was a Canadian sailor. He placed eighth in the Star class at the 1948 Summer Olympics.

References

External links

 
 
 
 

1923 births
2019 deaths
Canadian male sailors (sport)
Olympic sailors of Canada
Sailors at the 1948 Summer Olympics – Star